The 2011–12 Cal State Bakersfield Roadrunners men's basketball team represented California State University, Bakersfield during the 2011–12 NCAA Division I men's basketball season. The Roadrunners, led by first year head coach Rod Barnes, played their home games at the Icardo Center, with two home games at Rabobank Arena, and played as an independent. The Roadrunners were invited to the 2012 CollegeInsider Tournament for the programs first ever post season appearance since joining Division I. They lost in the first round to Utah State.

Roster

Schedule

|-
!colspan=9| Exhibition

|-
!colspan=9| Regular Season

|-
!colspan=9| 2012 CIT

References

Cal State Bakersfield Roadrunners men's basketball seasons
Cal State Bakersfield
Cal State Bakersfield